The Saint-Zéphirin River (in French: rivière Saint-Zéphirin) is a tributary on the west bank of the Nicolet Southwest River. It crosses the municipalities of Sainte-Brigitte-des-Saults, Saint-Zéphirin-de-Courval and La Visitation-de-Yamaska, in the Nicolet-Yamaska Regional County Municipality (MRC), in the administrative region of Centre-du-Québec, in Quebec, in Canada.

Geography 

The main neighboring hydrographic slopes of the Saint-Zéphirin river are:
 North side: Nicolet Southwest River, Nicolet River, Lake Saint-Pierre, St. Lawrence River;
 east side: Nicolet Southwest River, Nicolet River;
 south side: rivière des Frères, Landroche River, Colbert River, Saint-François River;
 west side: Lake Saint-Pierre, rivière des Frères, Landroche River, Colbert River.

The Saint-Zéphirin river takes its sources from agricultural streams, between the fifth rang road and the Saint-François River, in the municipality of Sainte-Brigitte-des-Saults.

  north, up to the small road joining the chemin du rang Sainte-Geneviève and rang Saint-François in the municipality of Saint-Zéphirin-de-Courval;
  north, passing east of the village of La Visitation-de-Yamaska where it intersects rue Principale (route 226) on the northeast side of the village, up to its confluence.

Toponymy 
The toponym "rivière Saint-Zéphirin" was made official on December 5, 1968, at the Commission de toponymie du Québec.

See also 

 List of rivers of Quebec

References 

Rivers of Centre-du-Québec
Nicolet-Yamaska Regional County Municipality